"Green Light" is a single by London-based grime music collective, Roll Deep. It was released by digital download on 15 August 2010 on Relentless / Virgin Records. The MCs who make an appearance in the song are Wiley, J2K, Breeze, Brazen and Scratchy. It was co-written by UK singer Angel. "Green Light" debuted on the UK Singles Chart on 29 August 2010 at number one, marking the band's second number-one single.

Critical reception
Robert Copsey of Digital Spy gave the song a three star rating, and said:

Roll Deep are fast becoming the very definition of a guilty pleasure. The arts of subtlety and sophistication might be lost on them, but boy do they know how to hit our musical G-spots. Having reached No.1 back in April with 'Good Times', the capital-based collective are back with another slab of grime/trance/pop built to fill dancefloors across the UK.

Over a jolting bassline and clubby urban beats, Wiley and crew search for ladies up for a bit of bump 'n' grind action. "I like what I see / Face lit up like a Christmas tree" raps Breeze - all she needs now is a couple of baubles, eh mate? Anyway, 'Green Light' isn't quite as brain-invading as its predecessor, but be warned, this one will eventually wriggle in and refuse to leave for a good while - a damn sight longer, we'd imagine, than these guys generally hang around the morning after. .

Track listings
CD single
 "Green Light" (Radio Edit) – 3:57

Digital download
 "Green Light" (Radio Edit) – 3:57
 "Green Light" (Extended Mix) – 5:12
 "Green Light" (Ill Blu Remix) – 5:11
 "Green Light" (Future Freakz Remix) – 5:57
 "Green Light" (Future Freakz Dub) – 5:57
 "Green Light" (Instrumental) – 3:57

Charts and certifications

Weekly charts

Year-end charts

Certifications

See also
List of number-one singles from the 2010s (UK)
List of number-one R&B hits of 2010 (UK)

References

2010 singles
2010 songs
Roll Deep songs
Number-one singles in Scotland
UK Singles Chart number-one singles
Songs written by Wiley (musician)
Relentless Records singles
Eurodance songs